A list of Scottish poets in English, Scottish Gaelic, Lowland Scots, Latin, French, Old Welsh and other languages. This lists includes people living in what is now Scotland before it became so.

A

Helen Adam
Henry Adamson
Hew Ainslie
Thomas Aird
Aithbhreac Inghean Coirceadal
Alasdair mac Mhaighstir Alasdair
Robert Allan
Sandra Alland
Robert Alves
Alexander Anderson
Freddie Anderson
William Anderson
Marion Angus
Aneirin
J. K. Annand
William Anstruther
Alexander Arbuthnot
Arthur Argo
John Armstrong
John Armstrong
Thomas Atkinson
William Auld
Robert Aytoun
William Edmondstoune Aytoun

B

Joanna Baillie
Alexander Bald
Alexander Balfour
James Ballantine
George Bannatyne
Anne Bannerman
John Barbour
John Barclay
Matthias Barr
Thomas de Barry
Meg Bateman
George Beattie
James Beattie
William Beattie
Beccán mac Luigdech
John Joy Bell
John Bellenden
David MacLeod Black
Sheena Blackhall
John Stuart Blackie
Thomas Blacklock
Robert Blair
Blind Harry
Alan Bold
Deric Bolton
Mark Alexander Boyd
David Boyle
Frederick Victor Branford
George Mackay Brown
Horatio Brown
Archibald Bruce
Michael Bruce
Giolla Críost Brúilingeach
John Buchan
Dugald Buchanan
George Buchanan
Robert Williams Buchanan
Rhoda Bulter
Haldane Burgess
James Drummond Burns
Elizabeth Burns
Robert Burns
John Burnside
John Burrell
Ron Butlin
Lord Byron

C

John M. Caie
Maoilios Caimbeul
Janet Caird
Angus Calder
Norman Cameron
A. Y. Campbell
Angus Peter Campbell
Dorothea Primrose Campbell
Thomas Campbell
Sìleas na Ceapaich
Kate Clanchy
Thomas A. Clark
William Cleland
W. D. Cocker
Arthur Conan Doyle
Stewart Conn
Dominic Cooper
Grace Corbett
Joe Corrie
Thomas Craig
Robert Crawford
Archibald Crawfurd
Duncan MacGregor Crerar
Iain Crichton Smith
Ian Crockatt
Helen Cruickshank
Allan Cunningham
Robert Cunninghame Graham of Gartmore
Walterina Cunningham
James Cuthbertson
Ivor Cutler

D–F

David Daiches
Hew Dalrymple
John Davidson
Robert Davidson
Thomas Davidson
Edward Davison
Christine De Luca
Imtiaz Dharker
Des Dillon
David Doig
Julia Donaldson
Rob Donn
Gavin Douglas
George Brisbane Scott Douglas
William Drummond of Hawthornden
William Dudgeon
Carol Ann Duffy
William Dunbar
Hal Duncan
Douglas Dunn
George Eglisham
Jean Elliot
Henry Erskine
Jenni Fagan
William Falconer
Henry Brougham Farnie
Vicki Feaver
Alison Fell
Robert Fergusson
John Ferriar
Alec Finlay
Ian Hamilton Finlay
John Finlay
Matthew Fitt
James Fordyce
Veronica Forrest-Thomson
William Forsyth
William Fowler
George Sutherland Fraser
Olive Fraser
Graham Fulton
Robin Fulton

G

Richard Gall
Miriam Gamble
Alexander Garden
Robert Garioch
Flora Garry
William Gay
Alexander Geddes
George Gilfillan
Robert Gilfillan
Robert Pearse Gillies
Duncan Glen
William Glen
John Glenday
Jean Glover
Robert Gordon of Straloch
Rody Gorman
James Graeme
Lollie Graham
W. S. Graham
James Grahame
James Grainger
Alex Grant
David Grant
Joseph Grant
Alasdair Gray
Alexander Gray
David Gray
James Gray
Andrew Greig
John Grieve

H

Kris Haddow
Jen Hadfield
George Halket
Janet Hamilton
Patrick Hamilton
Thomas Hamilton
William Hamilton (British Army officer)
William Hamilton (comic poet)
William Hamilton (Jacobite poet)
Patrick Hannay
Scott Hastie
Susanna Hawkins 
George Campbell Hay
Gilbert Hay
Hamish Henderson
Diana Hendry
J. F. Hendry
Robert Henryson
Thomas Nicoll Hepburn
W. N. Herbert
Robert Herring
William Hershaw
William Maxwell Hetherington
Robert Hetrick
James Hogg
Richard Holland
John Home
Tom Hubbard
Huchoun
Alexander Hume
David Hume of Godscroft
Patrick Hume of Polwarth
Anne Hunter
Pearse Hutchinson
James Hyslop

I-K

John Imlah
Mick Imlah
Iseabail Ní Mheic Cailéin
A. B. Jackson
Alan Jackson
Violet Jacob
James I of Scotland
Robert William Jameson
Kathleen Jamie
Robert Alan Jamieson
Arthur Johnston
John Johnston
Jackie Kay
Walter Kennedy
John Ker
William Knox
Rögnvald Kali Kolsson
Norman Kreitman
Frank Kuppner

L

R D Laing
Andrew Lang
John Lapraik
William Lauder
T. S. Law
Joseph Lee
Charlotte Lennox
Tom Leonard
Frances Leviston
Eddie Linden
Maurice Lindsay
Janet Little
Pippa Little
Liz Lochhead
John Logan
Iain Lom
John Longmuir
Roddy Lumsden
David Lyndsay
Agnes Lyon
John Lyon
Henry Francis Lyte

Mac/Mc

George MacBeth
Norman MacCaig
Hugh MacDiarmid
Andrew Macdonald
Donald MacDonald, Dòmhnall Ruadh Chorùna
George MacDonald
James Macfarlan
Murdo Macfarlane
James Pittendrigh Macgillivray
Alasdair Alpin MacGregor
Stuart MacGregor
Artúr Dall Mac Gurcaigh
Duncan Ban MacIntyre
James McIntyre
John William Mackail
Charles Mackay
John Henry Mackay
Lachlan Mackinnon
Ewart Alan Mackintosh
Ewen MacLachlan
Alasdair Maclean
Sorley MacLean
Anne MacLeod
Joseph Macleod
Aonghas MacNeacail
Kevin MacNeil
Hector Macneill
Robert Macnish
James Macpherson
Jamie Macpherson
Donnchadh MacRath
Brian McCabe
Marion McCready
Matthew McDiarmid
Elvis McGonagall
William McGonagall
William McIlvanney
Alastair McIntosh
Alexander McLachlan
Robert McLellan
Hugh McMillan

M

Wes Magee
Richard Maitland
Willy Maley
David Mallet
Peter Manson
Theodore Martin
James Maxwell
John Mayne
Isabella Fyvie Mayo
Robert Murray M'Cheyne
Gordon Meade
Elizabeth Melville
James Melville
William Mercer
William Meston
William Julius Mickle
William Miller
Christian Milne
Drew Milne
Elma Mitchell
Naomi Mitchison
David Macbeth Moir
Alexander Montgomerie
James Graham, 1st Marquess of Montrose
Edwin Morgan
J. O. Morgan
David R. Morrison
William Motherwell
Edwin Muir
Raman Mundair
John Munro
Neil Munro
William Murdoch
Charles Murray
Robert Fuller Murray

N–R

Carolina Nairne
Charles Neaves
William Neill
William Nicholson
Robert Nicoll
Niall O'Gallagher
William Henry Ogilvie
Meta Orred
George Outram
Janet Paisley
Alasdair Paterson
Don Paterson
Walter Perrie
Robert Pollok
Katrina Porteous
Richard Price
Alison Prince
Thomas Pringle
Pauline Prior-Pitt
John Purser
Walter Quin
Seán Rafferty
Tessa Ransford
Alastair Reid
Robert Rendall
Alan Riach
Henry Scott Riddell
Hugh S. Roberton
Gary Robertson
James Robertson
James Logie Robertson
Robin Robertson
John Rolland
David Rorie
Uilleam Ros
Dilys Rose
Alexander Ross

S

Suhayl Saadi
Lady Margaret Sackville
Stephen Scobie
Alexander Scott (16th-century poet)
Alexander Scott (20th-century poet)
Tom Scott
Walter Scott
Sir William Scott of Thirlestane
William Bell Scott
Thomas Seget
J. B. Selkirk
James Sempill
Robert Sempill
Robert W. Service
John Campbell Shairp
William Sharp
Nan Shepherd
David Sillar
Burns Singer
Felicia Skene
John Skinner
William Henry Oliphant Smeaton
Alexander Smith
John Gibson Smith
Morelle Smith
Sydney Goodsir Smith
Walter Chalmers Smith
Charles Sorley
William Soutar
Muriel Spark
Alan Spence
Charles Spence
Lewis Spence
Alicia Ann Spottiswoode, Lady John Scott
John Sterling
Gerda Stevenson
Robert Louis Stevenson
Ena Lamont Stewart
John Stewart of Baldynneis
John Alexander Stewart
John Roy Stewart
William Stewart
William Alexander, 1st Earl of Stirling
Thomas Tod Stoddart
John Struthers
Muriel Stuart
Maud Sulter

T-Z

Alexander Tait
Margaret Tait
Robert Tannahill (weaver poet)
Rachel Annand Taylor
William Tennant
William Thom
Thomas the Rhymer
Derick Thomson
James Thomson
James Thomson (weaver poet)
James Thomson (B.V.)
Ruthven Todd
Gael Turnbull
Joan Ure
Thomas Urquhart
Vagaland
George Valentine
Ryan Van Winkle
John Veitch
Florentius Volusenus
Roderick Watson
Lauchlan Watt
James Wedderburn
John Wellwood
Kenneth White
Brian Whittingham
Christopher Whyte
George Whyte-Melville
William Wilkie
Colin Will
Kevin Williamson
John Wilson
Rab Wilson
William Wilson
David Wingate
John Wright
William Wright
Andrew Young
Douglas Young
John Younger

See also
 List of Scottish writers
 List of Scottish dramatists
 List of Irish poets

Poets
Lists of poets
Poets